Grands Prix (GPs) are professional Magic: The Gathering tournaments, awarding cash prizes, Pro Points and invitations to Pro Tours. They are open to all players and are usually the biggest Magic tournaments. The first Grand Prix was held on 22–23 March 1997 in Amsterdam (Netherlands). By the end of 2018, 654 Grand Prix events have been held, the biggest being GP Las Vegas 2015 with 7,551 competitors, making it the biggest trading card game tournament ever held. 

Grand Prix tournaments are the main event of a minimum three-day mini-convention. The term "Grand Prix" can refer to either the tournament or to the entire weekend. Starting in 2019, as part of a broader re-branding, the term MagicFest was introduced to refer to the overall event, which includes both the Grand Prix main event and a number of Side Events, which last for only a few hours and which have comparatively smaller prize pools.

History 

The first Grand Prix was in 1997. Unlike the invitation-only Pro Tour, GPs have always been open to all players. The first Grand Prix was held in Amsterdam and it was also the first professional Magic tournament held outside the United States. The total prize pool was $30,000, compared to $250,000 at Pro Tour Paris a few weeks later. The scheduling of Grand Prix events has varied over time, with 20 to 30 events per year in the 1990s growing to 50-60 events per year today. Grand Prix main events are the largest Magic: the Gathering tournaments to take place, with the 2015 event in Las Vegas, NV, having a record 7,551 entrants.

Most Grand Prix weekends host only a single main event, however, some contain multiple. GP Las Vegas in 2015 was large enough to be broken up into two independent events. GP Las Vegas in 2017 was scheduled as three separate events - one each starting on Thursday, Friday, and Saturday. The main event at MF London in 2019 was scheduled as four separate events - two starting each on Friday and Saturday. Players could drop from an earlier flight and register for a later flight, to get multiple chances to perform well enough to make the cut. All four events re-combined on Sunday morning for "day 2" of competition. Other events have also used these formats, especially in locations where the number of players likely to attend would make a single event prohibitively large.

Starting in 2019, the Grand Prix weekend was renamed as MagicFest, and the term Grand Prix now refers only to the main event. The average main event has between 1,000 and 1,500 competitors playing for a prize pool of $35,000 to $65,000, depending on the event's location and format.

Tournament structure 
With the exception of some Grands Prix that have multiple main events, most are two day tournaments, taking place on weekends. The day prior to the start of the event (usually Friday) hosts a number of side events, including Last Chance Trials. Competitors who win a Last Chance Trial receive a two round bye to the Grand Prix, which can otherwise only be earned through having a certain number of Pro Points or Planeswalker Points. On Day 1 (usually Saturday), the tournament begins using the swiss tournament structure. The exact number of rounds has varied over the history of GPs, currently eight or nine rounds are played on Day 1. After the 8th round, a cut is performed. All competitors with a record of 6 wins and 2 losses or better are allowed to continue playing. Despite taking place after the cut, the ninth round is still played on Day 1 at Limited tournaments for logistical reasons.

On Day 2, play continues for an additional six or seven rounds (again, depending on the format). At the conclusion of the swiss rounds, the eight players with the best records advance to the single-elimination Top 8.

For Grands Prix played in a Constructed format all rounds are played with the same decks. Limited Grands Prix have a Sealed Deck portion on day 1 and Booster Drafts on day 2.

Prizes 

Grands Prix award cash prizes, Pro Points, and invitations to a Pro Tour. The best eight competitors (or best four teams for team Grand Prix) - or all players with at least 39 match points at the end of the tournament, whichever is greater - receive an invitation to a previously determined Pro Tour. Cash prizes have varied considerably, ranging from $10,000 to $75,000. From 2013 to 2018, prize payout varied based on the number of competitors. In 2019, a system was introduced where the prize payout can vary based on expected attendance (from $35,000 to $80,000), but is always announced in advance, to allow competitors to know that information when deciding which events to travel to.

Of the total prize pool, the champion receives between $6,000 and $10,000. As many as 225 players can receive prizes, of $200 or more.

See also 

The DCI
Pro Tour
List of all GPs

References

External links 
 Official Grand Prix page at Wizards.com

Magic: The Gathering professional events
Recurring events established in 1997